Masterton East (also known as Eastside or Cameron Block) is a suburb of Masterton, a town on New Zealand's North Island.

It is a low socio-economic area with social housing, with about 15% of Masterton's population. About 30% of the population are Māori, primarily belonging to Rangitāne and Ngāti Kahungunu.

A central feature of the park is McJorrow Park, a soccer park. Playgrounds, an asphalt basketball court, a sunshade, seating and outside tables were installed in the park between 2015 and 2017.

The park features Te Awhina Cameron Community House, a community centre that hosts English as a Second Language classes, playgroup, cooking classes and furniture workshops. The building was renovated between 2013 and 2014.

In 2018, Masterton District Council and the Eastside Community Group worked on a project to slow vehicles through the area. Some cars were significantly damaged by one steep obstacle installed on River Road.

Later the same year, Massey University students developed ideas to improve the area, including further road changes and turning graffiti into public art. The ideas was passed on to the Eastside Community Group to consider.

Demographics

Masterton East had a population of 3,837 at the 2018 New Zealand census, an increase of 261 people (7.3%) since the 2013 census, and an increase of 444 people (13.1%) since the 2006 census. There were 1,449 households. There were 1,860 males and 1,977 females, giving a sex ratio of 0.94 males per female, with 822 people (21.4%) aged under 15 years, 816 (21.3%) aged 15 to 29, 1,533 (40.0%) aged 30 to 64, and 663 (17.3%) aged 65 or older.

Ethnicities were 72.0% European/Pākehā, 36.8% Māori, 7.6% Pacific peoples, 4.3% Asian, and 1.3% other ethnicities (totals add to more than 100% since people could identify with multiple ethnicities).

The proportion of people born overseas was 10.7%, compared with 27.1% nationally.

Although some people objected to giving their religion, 52.6% had no religion, 32.1% were Christian, 0.6% were Hindu, 0.2% were Muslim, 0.2% were Buddhist and 6.3% had other religions.

Of those at least 15 years old, 285 (9.5%) people had a bachelor or higher degree, and 852 (28.3%) people had no formal qualifications. The employment status of those at least 15 was that 1,227 (40.7%) people were employed full-time, 426 (14.1%) were part-time, and 171 (5.7%) were unemployed.

Education

It was founded in 1968.

The Wairarapa Teen Parent Unit is attached to the school.

References

Suburbs of Masterton